Artëm Vladimirovič Zabelin (born January 15, 1988) is a Russian professional basketball player for UNICS of the VTB United League. He is a forward-center.

Professional career
Zabelin made his professional debut with Avtodor Saratov during the 2003-04 season. He joined CSKA Moscow in 2007. In July 2011, he signed a two-year contract with Lokomotiv Kuban. In 2019, Zabelin signed with Parma and averaged  10.4 points and 3.7 rebounds per game. During the 2020-21 season, he signed with Temp-SUMZ-UGMK Revda of the Russian Basketball Super League 1 and averaged 4.7 points and 2.5 rebounds per game. On August 29, 2021, Zabelin returned to Parma.

On July 2, 2022, he has signed with UNICS of the VTB United League.

Russian national team
Zabelin has also been a member of the Russian national junior teams.

References

External links
 Euroleague.net Profile
 Eurobasket.com Profile

Living people
1988 births
BC Avtodor Saratov players
BC Khimik players
BC Krasnye Krylia players
BC Spartak Primorye players
BC UNICS players
Centers (basketball)
Russian expatriate basketball people in Ukraine
Parma Basket players
PBC CSKA Moscow players
PBC Lokomotiv-Kuban players
Power forwards (basketball)
Russian expatriate basketball people in Italy
Russian men's basketball players
Sportspeople from Khabarovsk